André Weßels (also spelled Wessels; born 21 October 1981) is a German former fencer. He competed in the individual and team foil events at the 2004 Summer Olympics. He also competed at the 2012 Summer Olympics winning a bronze medal in the team foil.

References

External links
 

1981 births
Living people
German male fencers
Olympic fencers of Germany
Olympic bronze medalists for Germany
Olympic medalists in fencing
Fencers at the 2004 Summer Olympics
Fencers at the 2012 Summer Olympics
People from Recklinghausen
Sportspeople from Münster (region)
Medalists at the 2012 Summer Olympics